Apamea siskiyou is a species of cutworm or dart moth in the family Noctuidae. It is found in North America.

The MONA or Hodges number for Apamea siskiyou is 9334.1.

References

Further reading

 
 
 

Apamea (moth)
Articles created by Qbugbot
Moths described in 2009